Paula Ormaechea won the title, defeating Julia Cohen in the final, 7–5, 6–1.

Seeds 

  Julia Cohen (final)
  María Fernanda Álvarez Terán (semifinals)
  Lauren Albanese (quarterfinals)
  Mailen Auroux (semifinals)
  Paula Ormaechea (champion)
  Vivian Segnini (first round)
  Lena Litvak (quarterfinals)
  Nathalia Rossi (quarterfinals)

Draw

Finals

Top half

Bottom half

References 
 Main draw

Seguros Bolivar Open Bogota - Singles
2010 WS